David Doherty is a New Hampshire politician.

Education
Doherty graduated from Sacred Heart High School in Waterbury, Connecticut. He earned a B.A. in political science from Merrimack College in 1967 and an M.A. in guidance and psychology from Assumption College in 1969.

Career
Doherty previously worked as a guidance counselor, a position he retired from in 2008. He is a member of the Pembroke School Board, and has been since 2012. On November 4, 2014, Doherty was elected to the New Hampshire House of Representatives where he represents the Merrimack 20 district. He assumed office on December 3, 2014. He is a Democrat.

Personal life
Doherty resides in Pembroke, New Hampshire. He is married and has three children.

References

Living people
People from Pembroke, New Hampshire
Merrimack College alumni
Assumption University (Worcester) alumni
School board members in New Hampshire
Democratic Party members of the New Hampshire House of Representatives
21st-century American politicians
Year of birth missing (living people)